"I'm Your Witchdoctor" is a 1965 single by John Mayall & the Bluesbreakers composed by Mayall, produced by Jimmy Page, and issued on the Immediate label. The exact date or London studio for the recording session has not been determined, but in all likelihood it was recorded at IBC Studios in August 1965 after Page was appointed house producer at Immediate Records. Instead of featuring a regular guitar solo, the recording is characterized by Clapton's overdriven one-note sustain.

It has been covered by Motörhead, Them, and Chants R&B.

Personnel
Guitar: Eric Clapton
Keyboard, vocals: John Mayall
Bass: John McVie
Drums: Hughie Flint

References

1965 singles
Motörhead songs
Songs written by John Mayall
Song recordings produced by Jimmy Page
1965 songs
Immediate Records singles